Aphroditopolis or Aphrodites Polis, meaning city of Aphrodite, is the Greek name of several places in ancient Egypt:

Aphroditopolis in the Antaiopolite Nome, also called Aphrodito, ancient Per-Wadjet, now the village of Kom Ishqaw
Aphroditopolis in the Aphroditopolite Nome, now the village of Atfih
Aphroditopolis in the Faiyum Oasis, village attested between 3rd century BC and the 3rd century AD
Aphroditopolis in the Pathyrite Nome, now the village of Gebelein

See also
Aphroditopolite Nome

References